Ascheberg is a municipality in the district of Coesfeld in the state of North Rhine-Westphalia, Germany.
The neighbouring cities, towns and municipalities of Ascheberg are (clockwise, starting in the North) the city Münster, the town Drensteinfurt (District Warendorf), the city Hamm, the town Werne (District Unna, the municipalities Nordkirchen and Senden (both District Coesfeld)

Born in Ascheberg 

 Franz Falke (1909-1994), politician
 Wolfgang Sandhowe (born 1953 in Ascheberg), soccer player, today football coach

Twin cities
  Buggiano

References

Municipalities in North Rhine-Westphalia
Coesfeld (district)